Ardpatrick House is a category-B-listed 18th-century country house in Ardpatrick, South Knapdale, Argyll and Bute, Scotland.

History
A fortified dwelling or castle previously existed upon the site, however it is not known when it was constructed. Upon the formation of Clan MacAlister, becoming independent from Clan MacDonald in 1493, the chief, Iain Dubh (Anglicisation: Black John), created the seat of the clan at Ardpatrick.

The present house was built in 1769 for Angus MacAlester, 11th of Loup, by John Menelaws and Thomas Menelaws, from Greenock. The estate of Ardpatrick, including the cottage of Auchachoan was sold by Alexander MacAllister of Loup in 1796 to Walter Campbell of Skipness, who bought it for his son Colin Campbell. Ardpatrick was the seat of the Campbells of Ardpatrick until 1920. It was then the property of the Stewart family until 1947.

Citations

References

External links

Category B listed buildings in Argyll and Bute
Listed houses in Scotland
Clan MacAlister